Edward Howard McNamara (1926–2006) served as Wayne County, Michigan County Executive from 1987–2002, and also served as mayor of Livonia, Michigan, from 1970–1986, and as a member of Livonia City Council from 1962 to 1970. He is probably best known for overseeing the $1.6 billion expansion of Detroit Metropolitan Wayne County Airport. The expansion included two new runways and the new Edward H. McNamara Terminal, which was named in his honor.

McNamara was mentor to many leading Democrats, including Gov. Jennifer Granholm, who was Wayne County corporation Counsel under McNamara, prior to becoming Michigan Attorney General and later being elected as Michigan Governor.  McNamara also played a key role helping the election campaign of Kwame Kilpatrick for mayor of Detroit in 2001, whose father, Bernard Kilpatrick, was McNamara's Chief of Staff while county executive.

McNamara died on February 19, 2006.

References

1927 births
2006 deaths
Mayors of places in Michigan
Michigan city council members
County executives in Michigan
Michigan Democrats
People from Livonia, Michigan
20th-century American politicians
21st-century American politicians